Paolo Hewitt is a music journalist and writer from Woking in Surrey.

Biography
Hewitt was placed in care at a very early age, and went to live with a foster family. Following years of abuse he was sent to Burbank children's home in Woking at the age of ten. He has written about this period of his life in But We All Shine On.

Early career and journalism
Hewitt's first published work was a biography of The Jam entitled The Jam: A Beat Concerto which was published following their split in 1983. He has written on various subjects for The Guardian.

Books

Titles

References

External links 
  Paolo Hewitt Official Site
  RBP Biography
  Huffington Post interview
  Interview with Soccerphile

1958 births
Living people
People from Woking
English music journalists
English music critics
English adoptees